Zygrita diva is a species of beetle in the family Cerambycidae, and the only species in the genus Zygrita. It was described by Thomson in 1860.

References

Pteropliini
Beetles described in 1860